Billardiera coriacea is a twining shrub or climber in the family Pittosporaceae and native to the south-west of Western Australia.
It grows on lateritic soils and clay. Its white-cream-yellow, or purple flowers may be seen from May to November.

Like other members of the genus Billardiera, the flowers are 5-merous and hermaphroditic, with a perianth consisting of a distinct calyx and corolla, and with anthers which shed their pollen via a longitudinal slit. The ovary is superior and has parietal placentation.

References

External links
For images: Esperance wildflowers Billardiera coriacea

coriacea
Flora of Western Australia
Taxa named by George Bentham
Plants described in 1863